Giacomo Tazzi Biancani (1729-1789) was an Italian collector, if not archeologist, of ancient antiquities. His manuscripts on Etruscan patera, epigraphy, ancient medals and numismatics were respected by his peers in his native Bologna.

Giacomo was born to an aristocratic family in Bologna. He was a professor antiquity for the Accademia Fulginentis. Most of his work remained unpublished as manuscripts until his death. He was a member of various scientific societies in Italy. His large library was dispersed after his death. Among his manuscripts are:
Trattato delle pattere antiche
De Foliis (1776)
De cultura morum (1775)
De aere ad plantarum nutritionem atque accretionem
Degl'insetti
De antiquitates studio
De quibusdam Animalium exeuiis lapidefactis
Iter per montana quaedam agri bononiensi loca

References

1729 births
1789 deaths
Italian antiquarians
Linguists of Etruscan
17th-century Italian writers
People from Bologna